The Township of Manvers (area ) was a municipality in the former Victoria County, now the city of Kawartha Lakes, in the Canadian province of Ontario.

History

From 1792 to 1974 Manvers Township was located in Durham County, which was united with Northumberland County in 1800 for administrative purposes.

The township was officially established in 1816 and named in honour of Charles Pierrepont, 1st Earl Manvers. At that time land grants were made to United Empire Loyalists, retiring soldiers and other friends of the crown.
In 1974, an extensive re-organization of municipal administrative divisions took place. Durham County was separated from Northumberland County, renamed the Regional Municipality of Durham and incorporated most of the former Ontario County; in the process, Manvers Township was transferred to the County of Victoria.

Effective January 1, 2001, Victoria County was dissolved and its municipalities and townships were amalgamated; the new administrative municipal division was named the City of Kawartha Lakes.

Communities 

Ballyduff
Bethany
Brunswick
Fleetwood
Franklin
Lifford
Lotus
Manvers Station
Pontypool
Yelverton
Janetville

See also
List of townships in Ontario

References

Sources 

 Province of Ontario -- A History 1615 to 1927 by Jesse Edgar Middletwon & Fred Landon, copyright 1927, Dominion Publishing Company, Toronto.

Communities in Kawartha Lakes
Former township municipalities in Ontario